The first Fraser ministry (Liberal–National Country coalition) was the 50th ministry of the Government of Australia. It was led by the country's 22nd Prime Minister, Malcolm Fraser. The first Fraser ministry succeeded the Third Whitlam ministry, which dissolved on 11 November following the dismissal of the Whitlam government by Governor-General Sir John Kerr. As such, it was a caretaker ministry until a federal election could take place. To date, it is the last ministry not to be split between a Cabinet and outer ministry. In the event, the Coalition was ultimately elected on 13 December 1975, and this ministry was replaced by the second Fraser ministry on 22 December 1975.

As of 26 January 2023, Ian Sinclair and Peter Nixon are the last surviving members of the first Fraser ministry. Tony Street was the last surviving Liberal member.

Ministry

See also
 Second Fraser ministry
 Third Fraser ministry
 Fourth Fraser ministry

Notes

Ministries of Elizabeth II
1975 establishments in Australia
1975 disestablishments in Australia
1975 Australian constitutional crisis
Fraser, 1
Cabinets established in 1975
Cabinets disestablished in 1975
Ministry, Fraser 1